The espei rasbora, or lambchop rasbora (Trigonostigma espei) is a species of ray-finned fish in the genus Trigonostigma. It is named after the dark band that appears like a lamb chop along its body. The species is predominantly found in Thailand and Cambodia, with a population additionally known to occur on the island of Phú Quốc in Vietnam.

References 

Fish of Thailand
Trigonostigma
Taxa named by Herman Meinken
Fish described in 1967